Lukas Kübler (born 30 August 1992) is a German professional footballer who plays as a centre-back for Bundesliga club SC Freiburg.

Career statistics

References

1992 births
Living people
Sportspeople from Bonn
German footballers
Footballers from North Rhine-Westphalia
Association football defenders
Bonner SC players
1. FC Köln players
1. FC Köln II players
SC Freiburg players
SC Freiburg II players
Bundesliga players
2. Bundesliga players
Regionalliga players